The Brit Award for International Breakthrough Act was an award given by the British Phonographic Industry (BPI), an organisation which represents record companies and artists in the United Kingdom. The accolade used to be presented at the Brit Awards, an annual celebration of British and international music. The winners and nominees are determined by the Brit Awards voting academy with over one-thousand members, which comprise record labels, publishers, managers, agents, media, and previous winners and nominees.

History
The award was first presented in 1988 as awards as "International Newcomer" which were won by Terence Trent D'Arby. In 2003 the award was renamed to "International Breakthrough Act". The accolade was not handed out at the 2008 and 2009 ceremonies and has been defunct as of 2013.

Winners and nominees

Notes
 Tracy Chapman (1989), Björk (1994, 1996, 1998, 2016), Natalie Imbruglia (1999), Macy Gray (2000), Lady Gaga (2010), Lana Del Rey (2013) also won Brit Award for International Female Solo Artist
 Neneh Cherry (1990) also won Brit Award for International Solo Artist 
 Scissor Sisters (2005) also won Brit Award for International Group 
 Justin Bieber (2016) also won Brit Award for International Male Solo Artist

References

Brit Awards
Music awards for breakthrough artist
Awards established in 1988
Awards established in 2010
Awards disestablished in 2007
Awards disestablished in 2012